Listed below are prominent people from the Eastern Caribbean, the Guianas. Because of the close proximity of these countries, some people are listed under more than one heading. The following are not included: Bahamians, Belizeans, Cubans, Dominicans (from the Dominican Republic), Haitians, Jamaicans, or Puerto Ricans.

Antigua and Barbuda
List of British people of Antigua and Barbuda descent

Actors and comedians
 Anna Maria Horsford - actress (of Antiguan descent)

Artists
 Gregory Abbott - singer
 Jazzie B - singer (Soul II Soul)
 Shermain Jeremy

Athletes
 Che Adams - footballer
 Curtly Ambrose - cricketer
 Craig Speedy Claxton - basketball player (of Antiguan descent)
 Carl Herrera - former NBA basketball player
 Emile Heskey - football player (of Antiguan descent)
 Maurice Hope - boxer
 Colin Kazim-Richards - football player (of Antiguan descent)
 Ledley King - footballer
 Sir Isaac Vivian Richards - cricketer
 Richie Richardson - cricketer
 Andy Roberts - cricketer

Political leaders
Lester Bird
Sir Vere Cornwall Bird
Sir James Carlisle
Tim Hector
Sir Wilfred Jacobs
Baldwin Spencer
Sydney Walling
Sir George Walter

Writers and intellectuals
Leonard Tim Hector
Joanne C. Hillhouse
Marie-Elena John
Jamaica Kincaid

Barbados

Actors
Nicole Byer (father is Bajan)
Alfred Enoch (mother is Barbadian Brazilian)
Melyssa Ford
Doug E. Fresh
Meagan Good
Cuba Gooding Jr. (father is a first-generation Bajan American)
Omar Gooding
David Harewood (both parents Bajan)
LL Cool J (mother is a first-generation Bajan American)
Mari Morrow
Redd Pepper
Jada Pinkett Smith
Robert Christopher Riley (Trini mother, Bajan father)
Lamman Rucker (mother is a first-generation Bajan American)

Artists
 Ras Akyem
 Karl Broodhagen
 Edward Rupert Burrowes
 Alison Chapman-Andrews
 Jeena Chatrani
 Paul Dash
 Annalee Davis
 Stanley Greaves
 Gwendolyn Knight
 Coral Bernadine Pollard
 Sheena Rose

Athletes
Robert Bailey - American football player
Nigel Benn - British boxer
Andrea Blackett - hurdler
Emmerson Boyce - footballer who captained the 2013 FA Cup winning Wigan Athletic side
Fred Brathwaite - NHL goalie (born in Canada; both parents are from Barbados)
Pierre Browne - sprinter
Anson Carter - NHL player (born in Canada to parents from Barbados)
Ashley Cole - English footballer (parents are from Barbados)
Jon Cornish - CFL player (born in Canada to father from Barbados)
Joel Garner - cricketer
Kieran Gibbs (born in United Kingdom to father from Barbados) - footballer
Joshua Gibson - Aussie rules footballer (parents are from Barbados)
Gordon Greenidge - cricketer
Marlon Harewood - footballer
Ramon Harewood - American football player (Baltimore Ravens)
Desmond Haynes - cricketer
Hadan Holligan - footballer
Sir Conrad Hunte - cricketer
Paul Ince - English footballer and football manager (parents are from Christ Church, Barbados)
Winston Justice - American football player (Denver Broncos)
Darian King - professional tennis player
Zane Maloney - racing driver
Malcolm Marshall - cricketer
Fran Matthews - Negro league baseball player
Earl Maynard - bodybuilder, wrestler, etc.
Anton Norris - high jumper
Kemar Roach - cricketer
Sam Seale - American football player
Alana Shipp - American/Israeli IFBB professional bodybuilder
Sir Garfield Sobers - cricketer
Obadele Thompson - sprinter, etc.
Walter Tull - English footballer; first British-born black Army officer; father was from Barbados
Sir Clyde Walcott - cricketer
Joel Ward (both parents are immigrants from Barbados) - ice hockey player
Sir Everton Weekes - cricketer
Kevin Weekes - NHL goalie (born in Canada, parents are both from Barbados)
Andrew Wiggins - NBA basketball player (born in Canada, mother was born in Barbados)
Sir Frank Worrell - cricketer

Mariners
Stede Bonnet
William Shorey

Musicians
Afrika Bambaataa
Kelly Beckett - member of the Paradiso Girls
Vita Chambers
CJ Fly - rapper
Carl Cox - producer, DJ
Cover Drive - pop band consisting of Amanda Reifer, T-Ray Armstrong, Barry "Bar-Man" Hill and Jamar Harding
Damon Dash
Dave East - rapper
Faith Evans
Doug E. Fresh
Cuba Gooding, Sr.
Grandmaster Flash
Grynner
Alison Hinds
Jackie Opel
Jaicko - R&B and pop music singer-songwriter
Killy (rapper)
Ryan Leslie
Charles D. Lewis - artist, bassist, producer
Hal Linton
Livvi Franc
Magnet Man
Zeeteah Massiah
Rakim Mayers - artist (A$AP Rocky)
Mighty Gabby
Mark Morrison
Leigh-Anne Pinnock - member of Little Mix
Rayvon
Red Plastic Bag
Rihanna - singer
Rupee - musician, born Rupert Clarke
Shontelle - pop, reggae, and R&B singer
Arturo Tappin
Tory Lanez
Tweet - singer, born Charlene Keys
Joseph L. Walcott - founded the first black-owned nightclub in New England, featuring many jazz greats

Political leaders
Sir Grantley Adams
J. M. G. Adams
Owen Arthur
Errol Barrow
Sir Courtney Blackman
London Bourne - former Barbadian slave who became a merchant and abolitionist.
Bussa
Shirley Chisholm - Congresswoman
Anne C. Cools - Candian senator
Adrian Fenty - former Mayor of Washington, DC
Charles Gittens - first black United States Secret Service agent
Eric Holder - Attorney General of the United States
Sir Clifford Husbands
Gwen Ifill - American political journalist; television newscaster
Thomas R. Jones - former Civil Court judge and Civil Rights activist in Brooklyn, New York
Clyde Mascoll - Barbadian government official
Chirlane McCray - poet, public speech writer; married to New York City Mayor Bill de Blasio
Dame Billie Miller
Richard B. Moore
Mia Mottley - Barbadian prime minister
Charles O'Neale
Clement Payne
Erskine Sandiford - former Barbadian prime minister
Bret Schundler - former Mayor of Jersey City, New Jersey
Lloyd Sealy - first African American NYPD officer to command a police precinct and patrol borough
David Thompson - a Barbadian prime minister
Elizabeth Thompson (born 1961) - politician, Permanent Representative to the UN 
Dennis M. Walcott - Deputy Mayor for Education and Community Development in New York City
Frank L. White - original chef face on Cream Of Wheat box

Writers and intellectuals
Adisa Andwele - rhythm poet
Hilary Beckles - historian
Edward Brathwaite - poet and academic
Austin Clarke - author and poet
Tony Cozier - cricket writer and broadcaster
Alan Emtage - Internet pioneer
Neville Lancelot Goddard - mystic and author 
Abel Hendy Jones Greenidge - writer on history and law
Charles Wilton Wood Greenidge - organizational head
Ken R. Harewood - molecular biologist
Ted Harris - Sweden-based pastor, theologian and writer
Agymah Kamau - novelist
Odimumba Kwamdela - poet and novelist
George Lamming - author and poet
Glenville Lovell - author, playwright, dancer
Paule Marshall - novelist (born in USA)
Avinash Persaud - businessman
Sheena Rose - artist (born in USA)
Susan L. Taylor - former editor-in-chief of ''Essence'’ magazine (born in USA)

Others
Frederick Atkins - convicted murderer

Curaçao

Singers

Tory Lanez (mother from Curaçao)

Athletes
 Ozzie Albies
 Vurnon Anita
 Leandro Bacuna
 Tahith Chong
 Leroy Fer (parents both Curaçaoan descent)
 Kenley Jansen
 Andruw Jones
 Patrick Kluivert (mother of Curaçaoan descent)
 Jurgen Locadia
 Hedwiges Maduro (mother of Curaçaoan descent)
 Tyrell Malacia (father of Curaçaoan descent)
 Churandy Martina
 Javier Martina
 Armando Obispo (father of Curaçaoan descent)
 Jaron Vicario  (parents both Curaçaoan descent)
 Charlton Vicento (Parents both Curaçaoan descent)
 Errol Zimmerman

Comedians
Jandino Asporaat

Political leaders
Daniel De Leon
Moises Frumencio da Costa Gomez
Ben Komproe
Maria Liberia-Peters

Dominica
List of British people of Dominica descent

Media 
Maurice DuBois
Edward Scobie

Musicians
Lemuel McPherson Christian
Pearle Christian
Ophelia Marie

Political leaders
Phyllis Shand Allfrey
Dame Eugenia Charles
Pierre Charles
Rosie Douglas
Edison James
Patrick R. John
Edward Oliver LeBlanc
Nicholas Liverpool
Doreen Paul
Sir Clarence Seignoret
Oliver Seraphin
Vernon Shaw
Roosevelt Skerrit
Crispin Sorhaindo

Cricketers
 Adam Sanford
Liam Sebastien
Shane Shillingford

Soccer
 Tobi Jnohope

Writers and intellectuals
Lennox Honychurch
Jean Rhys

French Guiana

Political leaders
Léon Bertrand
Justin Catayée
Félix Éboué
Gaston Monnerville
Victor Schœlcher
Christiane Taubira

Writers and intellectuals
Léon Damas

Athletes
 Ludovic Baal
 Alexis Claude-Maurice
 Roy Contout
 Simon Falette
 Marc-Antoine Fortuné
 Jaïr Karam
 Mike Maignan
 Florent Malouda
 Ludovic Proto
 Jean-Clair Todibo

Grenada
List of British people of Grenadian descent

Artists
Canute Caliste

Athletes
Lewis Hamilton - F1 driver and 7-time World Champion 2008, 2014, 2015, 2017, 2018, 2019, & 2020 seasons.
Kirani James - Grenadian sprinter who specialises in 200 and 400 meters;
Yazmeen Jamieson
Cameron Jerome
Jason Roberts - footballer currently playing for Blackburn Rovers

Business people and agriculturalists
James Baillie

Musicians
Ajamu
Casey Benjamin - member of the Robert Glasper Project
Craig David (of Grenadian descent)
Dollarman
David Emmanuel
Leslie Hutchinson
Finley Jeffrey
Jemeni
Row Lewis
Mighty Sparrow
Ms. Dynamite
Sir Galba
Sonika

Political leaders
Jean Augustine
Maurice Bishop
Herbert A. Blaize
Nicholas Brathwaite
Tubal Uriah Butler
Henri Christophe
Bernard Coard
Eric Gairy
Malcolm X (of Grenadian descent)
Dickon Mitchell
Keith Mitchell
David Paterson (Grenadian grandfather)
David Pitt, Baron Pitt of Hampstead
Tillman Thomas

Writers and intellectuals
Tobias S. Buckell
Merle Collins
Franklyn Harvey
Audre Lorde (of Grenadian descent)
Jacob Ross

Guadeloupe

Artists
 Jacques Schwarz-Bart

Athletes
Eric Abidal
Jocelyn Angloma
Christine Arron
Jonathan Biabiany
Jim Bilba
Pascal Chimbonda
Wylan Cyprien
Laura Flessel-Colovic
William Gallas
Thierry Henry
Layvin Kurzawa
Thomas Lemar
Jérôme Moïso
Jean-Marc Mormeck
Marie-José Pérec
Mickaël Piétrus
Therry Racon
Teddy Riner
Louis Saha
Kevin Seraphin
Jordan Tell
Lilian Thuram
Marius Trésor
Ronald Zubar

Filmmakers
Sarah Maldoror

Political leaders
Louis Delgrès
Victor Hugues
Victorin Lurel
Stéphane Pocrain
Patrick Reason

Religious leaders
Jean Baptiste Labat

Writers and intellectuals
Maryse Condé
Daniel Maximin
Saint-John Perse
Simone Schwarz-Bart

Guyana
List of Guyanese British people

Artists
Stanley Greaves
George Simon
Aubrey Williams
Denis Williams

Athletes
Martin Braithwaite
Shivnarine Chanderpaul
Nicolette Fernandes
Lance Gibbs
Carl Hooper
Rohan Bholalall Kanhai
Clive Lloyd
Jaime Peters
Kieran Richardson
Ramnaresh Ronnie Sarwan

Musicians
Eddy Grant
Melanie Fiona
P. Reign
Red Cafe
Rihanna (Guyanese mother [not Bajan])
Saint Jhn

Political leaders
Brindley Benn
Forbes Burnham
Arthur Chung
Clinton Collymore
Hubert Nathaniel Critchlow
Cuffy
Jack Gladstone
Quamina Gladstone
David A. Granger
Bernie Grant
Sam Hinds
Desmond Hoyte
Cheddi Jagan
Janet Jagan
Bharrat Jagdeo
Eusi Kwayana
Moses Nagamootoo
Reepu Daman Persaud
Sir Shridath Ramphal
Clement Rohee
Rupert Roopnaraine

Writers and intellectuals
Edward Ricardo Braithwaite
Jan Carew
Martin Carter
David Dabydeen
Wilson Harris
Roy Heath
Matthew James Higgins
Edgar Mittelholzer
Walter Rodney
Ivan Van Sertima
A. J. Seymour
Eric Walrond

Martinique

Athletes
Claude Anelka
Nicolas Anelka
Garry Bocaly
Manuel Cabit
Mikaël Cantave
Joan Hartock
Steeven Langil
Peter Luccin
Johnny Marajo
Steve Marlet
Ronny Turiaf

Filmmakers
Euzhan Palcy

Political leaders
Joséphine de Beauharnais
Alfred Marie-Jeanne

Writers and intellectuals
Aimé Césaire
Patrick Chamoiseau
Raphaël Confiant
Frantz Fanon
Édouard Glissant
René Maran
Jeanne Nardal
Paulette Nardal
Joseph Zobel

Saint Kitts and Nevis
List of British people of Saint Kitts and Nevis descent

Sports Personalities
Keith Arthurton
Kim Collins
Derick Parry
Elquemedo Willett
Stuart Williams

Soccer
 Marcus Rashford

Business and agriculture
James Baillie

Political leaders
Sir Clement Arrindell
Robert Bradshaw
Denzil Douglas
Alexander Hamilton
Timothy Harris
Rawlins Lowndes
Sir Lee Moore
Sir Cuthbert Sebastian
Sir Kennedy Simmonds
Paul Southwell

Writers, intellectuals, filmmakers, and artists
Joan Armatrading
Imruh Bakari
Christene Browne
Burt Caesar
Pogus Caesar
Caryl Phillips
Cicely Tyson

Saint Lucia
 See also List of Saint Lucians
List of British people of Saint Lucian descent

Actors
 Marianne Jean-Baptiste
 Joseph Marcell

Artists
Winston Branch
Dunstan St. Omer
Llewellyn Xavier

Athletes
 Ken Charlery (St Lucian Parents)
 Jermain Defoe (St Lucian mother)
 Anton Ferdinand (St Lucian father)
 Les Ferdinand
 Rio Ferdinand (St Lucian father)
 Dominic Johnson
 Cyrille Regis
 Dave Regis
 John Regis
 Darren Sammy

Economists
 Sir Arthur Lewis

Musicians
 Shola Ama
 Nicole David
 Ronald "Boo" Hinkson
 Joey Badass
 Trevor Nelson

Political leaders
Kenny Anthony
Winston Cenac
George Charles
Sir John Compton
Julian Hunte
Sir Allen Lewis
Vaughan Lewis
Sir Allan Louisy
Dame Pearlette Louisy
George Odlum
Philip J. Pierre

Writers and intellectuals
Derek Walcott

Saint Vincent and the Grenadines

Athletes
 Adonal Foyle
 Dan Gadzuric
 Jesse Lingard
 Sancho Lyttle
 Sophia Young

Musicians
 Kevin Lyttle
 Mattafix

Political leaders
Sir Charles Antrobus
Sir Frederick Ballantyne
Milton Cato
Joseph Chatoyer
Arnhim Eustace
Ralph Gonsalves
Sir David Jack
Ebenezer Joshua
Sir James F. Mitchell
Sir Louis Straker

Suriname

Artists 
Ramdew Chaitoe
Damaru
Dropati
Natalie La Rose

Athletes
 Donyell Malen
 Dwight Tiendalli
 Florian Jozefzoon
Tommy Asinga
Ryan Babel
Remy Bonjasky
Edgar Davids
Eljero Elia
Ilonka Elmont
Ruud Gullit
Ernesto Hoost
Patrick Kluivert
Anthony Nesty
Frank Rijkaard
Clarence Seedorf
Tyrone Spong
Letitia Vriesde
Aron Winter
 Jimmy Floyd Hasselbaink
 Kevin Wattamaleo
 Kurt Elshot
 Sigourney Bandjar
 Romario Sabajo

Inventors
Jan Earnst Matzeliger

Political leaders
Jules Ajodhia
Henck Arron
Bram Behr
Dési Bouterse
Ronnie Brunswijk
Johan Ferrier
Otto Huiswoud
Harry Kisoensingh
Jagernath Lachmon
Pretaapnarian Radhakishun
Ram Sardjoe
Ronald Venetiaan
Jules Wijdenbosch

Writers and intellectuals
Aphra Behn
Anton de Kom
Lou Lichtveld

Musician
 Tony Scott

Trinidad and Tobago
 List of Trinidadian Britons

Artists
Isaiah James Boodhoo
Michel-Jean Cazabon
Boscoe Holder
Geoffrey Holder
Che Lovelace
Zak Ové

Athletes
 Carlos Edwards
Inshan Ali
Stephen Ames
Marvin Andrews
Ian Bishop
Marlon Black
Ato Boldon
George Bovell III
Dwayne Bravo
Darrel Brown
Marc Burns
Learie Constantine
Hasely Crawford
Rajindra Dhanraj
Mervyn Dillon
Ansil Elcock
Daren Ganga
Roger Gibbon
Hilary Angelo "Larry" Gomes
Gerald "Gerry" Gomez
Anthony Gray
Shaka Hislop
Clayton Ince
Stern John
Kenwyne Jones
Brian Lara
Russell Latapy
Leonson Lewis
Augustine "Gus" Logie
Clint Marcelle
Wendell Mottley
Deryck Murray
Jerren Nixon
Sonny Ramadhin
Manny Ramjohn
Dinanath Ramnarine
Anthony Rougier
Phil Simmons
Jeffrey Stollmeyer
Victor Stollmeyer
Richard Thompson
Evans Wise
Dwight Yorke
 Levi García

Dancers
Pearl Primus

Filmmakers
Horace Ové
Frances-Anne Solomon

Musicians
Attila the Hun (Raymond Quevado) - calypsonian
Winifred Atwell
Denise "Saucy Wow" Belfon
Inga "Foxy Brown" Marchand
Chalkdust (Hollis Liverpool)
Ken Marlon Charles (KMC)
Maximus Dan
Destra Garcia
Bunji Garlin
Haddaway
Heather Headley
Raymond Holman
Lord Invader
Lord Kitchener (Alwyn Roberts)
Lord Melody
Fay Ann Lyons-Alvarez
Mighty Sparrow (Slinger Francisco)
Mighty Spoiler
Nicki Minaj (Onika Tanya Maraj-Petty) - rapper
PartyNextDoor (Trinidadian father)
Cardi B (Belcalis Marlenis Almánzar) (Trinidadian mother)
Lennox "Bobby" Mohammed
Machel Montano
Billy Ocean
Denise Plummer
Sundar Popo
Patrice Roberts
David Rudder
Adesh Samaroo
Jit Samaroo
Hazel Scott
Len "Boogsie" Sharpe
Lord Shorty/Ras Shorty I (Garfield Blackman)
Black Stalin (Leroy Calliste)
André Tanker
Rakesh Yankaran

Political leaders
Tubal Uriah Butler
Rudranath Capildeo
Simbhoonath Capildeo
Stokely Carmichael (a.k.a. Kwame Ture)
George Chambers
Carson Charles
Arthur Andrew Cipriani (A. A. Cipriani)
Sir Ellis Clarke
Tracy Davidson-Celestine
Winston Dookeran
Knowlson Gift
Albert Gomes
Geddes Granger (Makandal Daaga)
Gary Griffith
Noor Hassanali
Karl Hudson-Phillips
A. P. T. James
Roy Joseph
Franklin Khan
Fuad Khan
Gillian Lucky
Ramesh Maharaj
Patrick Manning
Bhadase Sagan Maraj
Ralph Maraj
Wendell Mottley
George Padmore
Basdeo Panday
Kamla Persad-Bissessar
David Pitt, Baron Pitt of Hampstead
George Maxwell Richards
Adrian Cola Rienzi (born Krishna Deonarine)
A. N. R. Robinson
Keith Rowley
Austin "Jack" Warner
Dr. Eric Williams
Eric A. Williams
Gerald Yetming

Writers and intellectuals
Lloyd Best
Neil Bissoondath
Ralph de Boissière
Dionne Brand
Vahni Capildeo
Stokely Carmichael
Rosa Guy
Merle Hodge
C. L. R. James
Earl Lovelace
Mustapha Matura
Shiva Naipaul
V. S. Naipaul
Lakshmi Persaud
Kenneth Ramchand
Arnold Rampersad
Lall Sawh
Samuel Selvon
Eric Williams

United States Virgin Islands and British Virgin Islands

Actors
Kelsey Grammer
Lawrence Hilton-Jacobs

Artists and architects
Camille Pissarro
Dr. William Thornton

Athletes
Raja Bell
Horace Clarke
Midre Cummings
Tim Duncan
Julian Jackson
Calvin Pickering
Elmo Plaskett
 Trent Alexander-Arnold
 Tyler Adams

Doctors and scientists
Dr John C. Lettsom
Morris Simmonds

Political leaders
Edward Blyden
Frank Rudolph Crosswaith
Hubert Henry Harrison
Casper Holstein
Roy Innis
D. Hamilton Jackson
J. Raymond Jones
William Alexander Leidesdorff
T. McCants Stewart
Terence Todman
Denmark Vesey

Writers and intellectuals
Barbara Christian
Arthur Schomburg

Eastern